This is a list of all the United States Supreme Court cases from volume 358 of the United States Reports, which included cases from 1958 and 1959:

External links

1958 in United States case law
1959 in United States case law